Alpha Sunde Smaby (February 11, 1910 – July 18, 1991) was an American politician and teacher.

Born in Sacred Heart, Minnesota, Smaby graduated from the University of Minnesota and Winona State University. She then taught school and then worked for Cargill, Inc. Smaby served in the Minnesota House of Representatives from 1965 until 1969 and was a Democrat. During the 1968 United States presidential election, Smaby was a delegate to the Democratic Party Convention and supported United States Senator Eugene McCarthy. Smaby died of cancer in Saint Paul, Minnesota.

Almost three years before her death, Smaby was McCarthy's vice-presidential running mate for the Progressive Party only in her state. She and McCarthy received 5,403 votes.

Notes

1910 births
1991 deaths
People from Sacred Heart, Minnesota
University of Minnesota alumni
Winona State University alumni
Women state legislators in Minnesota
Democratic Party members of the Minnesota House of Representatives
Female candidates for Vice President of the United States
1988 United States vice-presidential candidates
20th-century American politicians
20th-century American women politicians